Norman's Cove-Long Cove is a town in the Canadian province of Newfoundland and Labrador. The town had a population of 647 in the Canada 2021 Census, down from 720 in 2011.

Demographics 

References

See also
 List of municipalities in Newfoundland and Labrador

Towns in Newfoundland and Labrador